Fort Smith ( "beside the rapids") is a town in the South Slave Region of the Northwest Territories (NWT), Canada. It is located in the southeastern portion of the Northwest Territories, on the Slave River and adjacent to the Alberta border along the 60th parallel north.

History 

Fort Smith was founded around the Slave River. It served a vital link for water transportation between southern Canada and the western Arctic. Early fur traders found an established portage route from what is now Fort Fitzgerald on the western bank of the Slave River to Fort Smith. This route allowed its users to navigate the four sets of impassable rapids (Cassette Rapids, Pelican Rapids, Mountain Rapids, and Rapids of the Drowned). The portage trail had been traditionally used by local Indigenous people for centuries.

The Indigenous population of the region shifted as the fortunes of the tribes changed. By 1870, Cree had occupied the Slave River Valley. The Slavey had moved north by this time and the Chipewyan had also begun moving into the area.

Peter Pond of the North West Company was the first white trader to travel on the Slave River and make contact with Indigenous people in this region. He established a post on Lake Athabasca called Fort Chipewyan in the 1780s, at the head of the Slave River.

The fur trade, dominated by the activities of the Hudson's Bay Company, penetrated deeper into the Mackenzie River district in the 19th century. York boats were used to run the Slave River rapids and where needed small portages were established to bypass the most dangerous areas. Nonetheless, serious mishaps were bound to happen, and the section of the Slave River became known as 'The Rapids of the Drowned'. In 1872, the Hudson's Bay Company built an outpost called Smith's Landing (Fort Fitzgerald) at the most southern set of the Slave River rapids. In 1874, another outpost was constructed at the most northern set of rapids.  It was called Fort Smith. Both posts were named in honour of Donald Alexander Smith, who was later, in August 1897, elevated to the Peerage of the United Kingdom as The 1st Baron Strathcona and Mount Royal.

In 1876, the Roman Catholic Mission was moved from Salt River to Fort Smith while the community was prospering.

In 1886, the Hudson's Bay Company launched the steam-propelled vessel SS Wrigley to run from Fort Smith to the Mackenzie River. The steamer  ran the Slave River from Fort McMurray to the head of the rapids at Smith's Landing beginning in 1882.
In 1898, the Yukon Gold Rush brought many gold seekers over the portages and through Fort Smith. In 1908, a new HBC steamer paddlewheeler, SS Mackenzie River, was launched to operate on the Slave and Mackenzie Rivers below Fort Smith (see boats of the Mackenzie River watershed).

In 1911, government was established in Fort Smith when Ottawa sent an Indian agent and a regional medical doctor, and the Royal Northwest Mounted Police opened a detachment. With these developments, Fort Smith became not only the transportation centre for the western Arctic but the administrative centre as well.

The mission sawmill produced lumber for the first hospital, St. Anne's, built in 1914 for the Grey Nuns. The sawmill also supplied the lumber for the first school built in 1915. Also maintained by the Roman Catholic Mission was St. Bruno's Farm that supplied produce, meat, and dairy products. Until it was closed in the 1920s, the farm supplied all the church's missions in the western Arctic. It maintained a herd of more than 140 cattle.

Horse-drawn freight services were complemented by tractors in 1919, when the Alberta & Arctic Transportation Company, a subsidiary of Lamson & Hubbard Trading Company, commissioned two  tractors on the Slave River portage to haul commercial freight from one side of the rapids to the other.

With the discovery of oil at Norman Wells in 1920, a federal government administration building was constructed to house the new Northwest Territories branch and the first court of justice in the Mackenzie District. The Union Bank of Canada, making use of a tent, opened the first bank in the Northwest Territories in Fort Smith in June 1921.

Distributor was launched in 1920 by the Lamson & Hubbard Trading Company to service its trading posts along the Mackenzie River. This group was taken over by the HBC in 1924. By the 1930s, a significant part of the Fort Smith economy was centred around ship and barge building with the HBC and Northern Transportation Company Limited (NTCL) establishing shipyards below Fort Smith.

Wood Buffalo National Park was established in 1922 with its operations and administration headquarters in Fort Smith.

In 1924, Fort Smith received the first of the Northwest Territories and Yukon Radio System installed by the Royal Canadian Corps of Signals. In 1928, Fort Smith Airport was built.

The discovery of gold in Yellowknife in 1938 also represented an economic boost to Fort Smith as many prospectors came passing through. In the same year, an Anglican Mission house was built and a church was added in 1939.

In 1942–1943, Fort Smith played its own small part in the war effort when huge armies raged across the globe in the Second World War. With a population of 250, Fort Smith hosted 2,000 United States Army soldiers who were en route to the Canol Oil Pipeline Project at Norman Wells and the Canol Road. They brought hundreds of barge loads of supplies; and in order to move these, they built a tractor road from Fort Smith to Hay River and even farther north.

The continued gold fever that fuelled Yellowknife's growth also allowed Fort Smith's population to grow five-fold in the decade following 1945. This was reflected in the increase in government administrative facilities and the growth of its role as a transportation hub for the Mackenzie District.

Fort Smith was incorporated as a village in 1964; two years later, with a population of 2,130, the village became a town on October 1, 1966. The all-weather road to Hay River was officially completed in 1966 as well, permanently linking Fort Smith to the south.

The completion of a southern rail link to Hay River in 1964 meant that Fort Smith's role as the transportation hub was largely negated; and, subsequently, shipping operations on the Slave River ceased in 1968.

When Yellowknife became the territorial capital in 1967, Fort Smith still remained the administrative centre of the government of the Northwest Territories' vast region. See history of Northwest Territories capital cities.

On Friday August 9, 1968, disaster struck Fort Smith when a landslide some  broke away from the riverbank causing property damage and killing one person. The riverbank area has since been sloped to stabilize it; and now the gentle hillside is known as the Riverbank Park, complete with groomed trails, picnic areas, and a viewing platform where one can see the Rapids of the Drowned.

In 1970, the Adult Vocational Training Centre was opened. Its operations were later expanded and in 1981 it became Thebacha College. A few years later, Arctic College was created by the government of the Northwest Territories and the Thebacha Campus was also home to the headquarters offices. In 1995, the college changed its name to Aurora College to allow Nunavut the use of the Arctic College name.

Today, Fort Smith's economy is based on the federal, territorial, and aboriginal governments along with education and tourism. In 2008, there was some interest in re-establishing a portage route to supply the Fort McMurray oilsands operations.

Geography 
The park headquarters for Wood Buffalo National Park is located in Fort Smith. The headquarters and Thebacha Campus of Aurora College is located in Fort Smith; it is the largest of the three campus locations in the Northwest Territories. Fort Smith is located in the South Slave Region (administrative) and Region 5, Northwest Territories (census division). The town was previously in the Fort Smith Region census division.

Fort Smith is accessible all year long via the Fort Smith Highway. A winter road operates for several months to connect Fort Smith to Fort Chipewyan and from there to Fort McMurray. An all-weather road named Pine Lake Road links Fitzgerald.

Climate 
Fort Smith has a dry continental subarctic climate (Koppen: Dfc) with very long winters combined with warm but relatively short summers.

These are both the hottest and coldest temperatures ever recorded in the Northwest Territories.

Demographics 

According to the 2016 census, the majority of people in Fort Smith (1,645) were Indigenous of which 920 were First Nations, 585 were Métis and 135 Inuit. The main languages are English, Chipewyan (Dene), Cree, Dogrib (Tłı̨chǫ), Slavey-Hare, Inuinnaqtun (Inuvialuktun) and Inuktitut.

Government 
Local government consists of the Town of Fort Smith Council with 9 members (7 councillors, deputy mayor and mayor). The mayor works part-time and council is elected every three years. As of 2021 the current mayor of Fort Smith is Fred Daniels.

Fort Smith is represented by the Salt River First Nation #195 and are part of the Akaitcho Territory Government. As of June 2012, the Salt River First Nation had given the Akaitcho Territory Government the mandatory six months notice that they would be separating from the organization.

The Fort Smith Métis Council is the local representation for members of the Northwest Territory Métis Nation. In 1996, a framework agreement was signed with the government of the Northwest Territories and the government of Canada to commence negotiations on land, resources and self-government.

Attractions 

Fort Smith is the home of the Northern Life Museum and home of the museum ship Radium King.

Every year the South Slave Friendship Festival, a music and arts festival, occurs in Fort Smith, usually in August. Musicians and artists from across the Northwest Territories and many other faraway places come to interact with other artists and show off their talents to the public.

Many tourists come to see the world-class Slave River and many kayakers try its rapids.

Fort Smith Mission Park is a popular tourist attraction featuring historic buildings and a grotto from the Oblate Catholic Mission.

In the summer months, pelicans can be seen nesting on the various rapids near Fort Smith. Whooping cranes, an endangered species, also nest in the area during the summer and can be viewed via air charters as ground access is prohibited.

Education 
There are a number of educational facilities in Fort Smith including Joseph Burr Tyrrell Elementary School, Paul William Kaeser High School and the Thebacha Campus of Aurora College. Additionally, the main office of the South Slave Divisional Education Council is located in the town.

Notable residents 
Fort Smith is the birthplace of Mark Carney, former governor of both the Bank of England and the Bank of Canada.

See also 
List of municipalities in the Northwest Territories
Fort Smith (District) Heliport

References

Notes

External links 

Towns in the Northwest Territories
Communities in the South Slave Region
Hudson's Bay Company forts